The 2016 Yas Marina GP2 Series round was a GP2 Series motor race held on 26 and 27 November 2016 at the Yas Marina Circuit in the United Arab Emirates. It was the final showdown of the 2016 GP2 Series. The race weekend supported the 2016 Abu Dhabi Grand Prix.

It was also originally planned to be the final race for the Dallara GP2/11 chassis that was first introduced in 2011 and the Mecachrome 4.0 litre V8 normally-aspirated engine package that had been used since the inaugural season of the series in 2005, before a new chassis and engine package was introduced for 2017, but both the current chassis and engine package had their services extended for one more season.

Background 
Carlin announced that Louis Delétraz would be replacing Marvin Kirchhöfer for the final round in Abu Dhabi. As well as Carlin, Arden International also announced that Emil Bernstorff would be replacing Jimmy Eriksson.

Classification

Qualifying 
Pierre Gasly took a crucial pole position which would help his bid to win the 2016 GP2 Series, with closest rival, Antonio Giovinazzi qualifying in sixth place.

Feature Race

Sprint Race

Standings after the round

Drivers' Championship standings

Teams' Championship standings

 Note: Only the top five positions are included for both sets of standings.

See also 
 2016 Abu Dhabi Grand Prix
 2016 Yas Marina GP3 Series round

References

External links 
 Official website of GP2 Series

GP2
Yas Marina
Yas Marina